100% NL is a Dutch commercial radio station which broadcasts nationwide on FM since 8 July 2006. 100% NL runs primarily Dutch products.

Music
In the first three years of the program profiled itself as a pop, rock and urban station aimed at young people. Due to lack of success the station dropped the format in mid-2008 and many presenters were dismissed. The station started focusing on nederpop and "soft" music and would go themselves as "women-friendly" programs with presenters such as Daphne Deckers, Myrna Goossen, Tanja Jess, and Elsemiek Hillen.

Today, 100% NL runs the music of the Netherlands with artists like Jan Smit, Nick & Simon, 3JS, Ilse Delange, Doe Maar, Bløf, Acda en De Munnik, Paul de Leeuw, Marco Borsato, Anouk, and Guus Meeuwis. But you can hear for example Armin van Buuren, Mr. Probz, Kensington, Rondé and other Dutch artists. Also you can hear hits from foreign artists such as Robbie Williams, Phil Collins, and UB40 where no Dutch were involved in the production.

Legal battle
The emergence of 100% NL characterized by numerous lawsuits. In 2003, the Dutch radio frequencies were re-distributed based on zero base, a redistribution of the AM and FM frequencies with the aim to offer more commercial radio stations access to the Dutch airwaves. This distribution is a comparative test with auction element.

European companies could apply for these frequencies and had to submit a business plan for the desired frequency. A number of national frequency packages (lots) were made available by the government without any conditions, called "plots". The "special stipulations plots" are packages which have conditions were set. For this special stipulations except plots had a business plan also be handed a program plan.

The plans submitted were compared by an independent committee (comparative test). If a package no special stipulations of the applications are head and shoulders above the rest would stabbing, the applicant for the financial bid would be the deciding factor (the auction element).

One of these plots was designated by the government for music of Dutch and European soil, the so-called plot A9. RTL Netherlands offered 35% Dutch language productions, while Media Sales 70% boosted in that category. The review committee found that this difference "not significant" was, after the financial bid of 23 million euros of RTL against the 8,000 euros of the Finnish Media Sales was decisive and RTL FM came on the air.

Media Sales, led by (then) ANP newsreader Herbert Fisher, then went to court. After two years of proceedings on the merits of the court ruled The Hague Finnish Media Sales in the same. Eventually 100% NL on 8 July 2006 beginning with the first broadcast.

In 2009 100% NL was nominated for a Marconi Award.

First broadcast
On the night of 7 to 8 July 2006, the start of the program began with a broadcast from the boiler house at the Westergasfabriek Terrain in Amsterdam. DJs Eline la Croix and Casper Meijer presented the live show with urban artists like K-Liber 4 Life, The Opposites, and Ninthe. The first song played was "The Right Side Won" by What Fun! and was preceded by a speech by 100% NL spokesman Herbert Visser.

Sister stations
100% NL TV is a television channel which started in 2013 as a TV channel of 100% NL. In addition, the station has a number of digital channels that link to 100% NL, like 100% NL Dance, 100% NL Feest, and 100% NL Liefde.

External links
  

Radio stations in the Netherlands
Mass media in Bussum
Radio stations established in 2006